8-hydroxygeraniol dehydrogenase (8-hydroxygeraniol oxidoreductase, CYP76B10, G10H, CrG10H, SmG10H, acyclic monoterpene primary alcohol:NADP+ oxidoreductase) is an enzyme with systematic name (6E)-8-hydroxygeraniol:NADP+ oxidoreductase. This enzyme catalyses the following chemical reaction

 (6E)-8-hydroxygeraniol + 2 NADP+  (6E)-8-oxogeranial + 2 NADPH + 2 H+ (overall reaction)
 (1a) (6E)-8-hydroxygeraniol + NADP+  (6E)-8-hydroxygeranial + NADPH + H+
 (1b) (6E)-8-hydroxygeraniol + NADP+  (6E)-8-oxogeraniol + NADPH + H+ 
 (1c) (6E)-8-hydroxygeranial + NADP+  (6E)-8-oxogeranial + NADPH + H+ 
 (1d) (6E)-8-oxogeraniol + NADP+  (6E)-8-oxogeranial + NADPH + H+

This enzyme contains Zn2+. It catalyses the oxidation of (6E)-8-hydroxygeraniol to (6E)-8-oxogeranial via either (6E)-8-hydroxygeranial or (6E)-8-oxogeraniol.

References

External links 
 

EC 1.1.1